The American Soccer League (ASL) was an American soccer league that held three seasons of play between August 2014 and 2017. It is the fourth league in U.S. history to use that name. The league footprint was in the northeastern United States. ASL players were paid, making it different from the NPSL or PDL models in which college-eligible players can compete.

American Professional Soccer (APS) is the parent company of American Soccer League (ASL). The league's goal was to eventually achieve U.S. Soccer Division 3 status. However, this did not materialize. Initially, the league was sanctioned by the United States Adult Soccer Association (USASA).

History 
Initially, the league played a traditional FIFA calendar schedule. After the first season, ASL switched formats to a Spring-Fall schedule. The ASL spring season ran from April to June. After a short break, the fall season continued in late August and ran until early November.

Teams

Champions

Rivalry Cups

See also
North American Soccer League
United Soccer League
Premier Development League
National Premier Soccer League

References

External links
 

 
3
United States Adult Soccer Association leagues
2013 establishments in the United States
Sports leagues established in 2013
2017 disestablishments in the United States
Sports leagues disestablished in 2017